Hicks is an unincorporated community in Warren County, in the U.S. state of Ohio.

History
A variant name was "Hick Station". The community has the name of one J. Hicks.

References

Unincorporated communities in Warren County, Ohio